Moshi Urban District (officially known as Moshi City Council) is an administrative district located in Kilimanjaro Region of Tanzania. The district is home to regional capital of Kilimanjaro Region, namely Moshi. The district is surrounded on the west by Moshi Rural District, to the east by the Hai District.
According to the 2012 Tanzania National Census, the population of Moshi Urban District was 184,292.

Administrative subdivisions

Wards 
The Moshi Urban District is administratively divided into 21 wards:

 Bondeni
 Kaloleni
 Karanga 
 Kiboriloni
 Kilimanjaro
 Kiusa
 Korongoni

 Longuo
 Majengo 
 Mawenzi
 Mji Mpya 
 Msaranga
 Njoro
 Rau

 Pasua
 Ng'ambo
 Mfumuni
 Miembeni
 Soweto
 Boma Mbuzi
 Shirimatunda

Education 
As of 2022, there were 80 Schools in Moshi Urban District, 52 of are primary schools and 28 are secondary schools.

References

Districts of Kilimanjaro Region

sw:Moshi Mjini